Holconia is a genus of Southern  Pacific huntsman spiders that was first described by Tamerlan Dahls  Thorell in 1877. It was branched from Isopeda in 1990.

List of species
,  it contains nine  species that are  found widespread  in Western Australia:
Holconia colberti Hirst, 1991 – Australia (Victoria), Colbert's huntsman
Holconia flindersi Hirst, 1991 – Australia (South Australia, Victoria, New South Wales), Flinders's banded huntsman
Holconia hirsuta (Ludwig  Koch, 1875) – Australia (Queensland), northern banded huntsman
Holconia immanis (Ludwig  Koch, 1867) – Australia, banded huntsman
Holconia insignis (T. D. Thorell, 1870) (type) – Australia (Queensland, New South Wales), giant huntsman
Holconia murrayensis Hirst, 1991 – Australia (South Australia, Victoria, New South Wales), Murray banded huntsman
Holconia neglecta Hirst, 1991 – Australia (Western Australia, Northern Territory), Neglecta's banded buntsman
Holconia nigrigularis (Simon, 1908) – Australia, giant gray huntsman
Holconia westralia Hirst, 1991 – Australia (Western Australia), West Australia banded huntsman

See also
 List of Sparassidae species

References

Araneomorphae genera
Sparassidae
Spiders of Australia
Taxa named by Tamerlan Thorell